Valmojado is a municipality located in the province of Toledo, Castile-La Mancha, Spain. According to the 2012 census (INE), it had a population of 4216 inhabitants.

References

Municipalities in the Province of Toledo